Bruno Giorgi (20 November 1940 – 22 September 2010) was an Italian football player and manager who played as a defender.

Biography
After an unremarkable career with teams such as Palermo and Reggiana, Giorgi became a football coach. In 1989, after several experiences in minor league football (including a stint at Vicenza during which he had the opportunity to launch a young Roberto Baggio into his early footsteps into first team football), and immediately after narrowly missing top flight promotion with Serie B outsiders Cosenza, he took the head coaching job at ACF Fiorentina (also, his first Serie A job) where he performed badly at domestic league level but also leading the club to the 1989–90 UEFA Cup final, being however removed from his position before the two-legged final itself was actually played.

In 1993, he was appointed head coach of Cagliari, an experience that ended after only one season with a remarkable 1993–94 UEFA Cup semi-final. He returned briefly at Cagliari in 1996 to replace Giovanni Trapattoni, and successively retired from football altogether.

On 29 September 2010 it was revealed that Bruno Giorgi had died exactly a week earlier in a Reggio Emilia clinic.

References

1940 births
2010 deaths
Italian footballers
Association football defenders
A.C. Reggiana 1919 players
Palermo F.C. players
Serie A players
Serie B players
Italian football managers
Calcio Padova managers
Brescia Calcio managers
L.R. Vicenza managers
Cagliari Calcio managers
ACF Fiorentina managers
Genoa C.F.C. managers
Modena F.C. managers
Empoli F.C. managers
Atalanta B.C. managers
Deaths from cancer in Emilia-Romagna